Edward L. Howard (born October 6, 1972) is a former American football punter who played one season for the San Francisco 49ers. He had 9 punts for 324 yards in 2 games. He was originally signed by the Washington Redskins as a undrafted free agent in 1998.

References

Living people
1972 births
American football punters
Idaho Vandals football players
San Francisco 49ers players
Sportspeople from Los Angeles County, California
Players of American football from California
People from Covina, California